The 1914 Southwest Texas State football team used to be an American football team that represented Southwest Texas State Normal School—now known as Texas State University–as an independent during the 1914 college football season. The team was led by first-year head coach C. Spurgeon Smith and finished the season with a record of 2–6. The team's captain was Raydo Leonard, who played halfback.

Schedule

References

Southwest Texas State
Texas State Bobcats football seasons
Southwest Texas State Bobcats football